Yayuk Basuki and Kyoko Nagatsuka were the defending champions but did not compete that year.

Naoko Kijimuta and Nana Miyagi won in the final 6–3, 6–1 against Barbara Rittner and Dominique Van Roost.

Seeds
Champion seeds are indicated in bold text while text in italics indicates the round in which those seeds were eliminated.

 Natalia Medvedeva /  Larisa Neiland (semifinals)
 Naoko Kijimuta /  Nana Miyagi (champions)
 Els Callens /  Rita Grande (quarterfinals)
 Annabel Ellwood /  Alexandra Fusai (semifinals)

Draw

External links
 1997 ANZ Tasmanian International Doubles Draw

Hobart International – Doubles
Doubles